Brigitte Freihold (born 9 April 1955) is a German politician. Born in Kaiserslautern, Rhineland-Palatinate, she represents The Left. Brigitte Freihold has served as a member of the Bundestag from the state of Rhineland-Palatinate since 2017.

Life 
After graduating from high school, Brigitte Freihold studied German and fine arts for the teaching profession for primary and secondary schools and worked as a teacher. She became member of the bundestag 
after the 2017 German federal election. She stood in Pirmasens and came in 5th place. She is a member of the Committee for Culture and Media. She is spokesperson for her group on Education for Sustainable Development.

References

External links 

  
 Bundestag biography 

1955 births
Living people
Members of the Bundestag for Rhineland-Palatinate
Female members of the Bundestag
20th-century German politicians
21st-century German women politicians
20th-century German women politicians
Members of the Bundestag 2017–2021
Members of the Bundestag for The Left